Onyeabor Ngwogu (born 3 October 1983) is a track and field sprint athlete who competes internationally for Nigeria.

Ngwogu represented Nigeria at the 2008 Summer Olympics in Beijing. He competed at the 4x100 metres relay together with Obinna Metu, Chinedu Oriala and Uchenna Emedolu. In their qualification heat they did not finish due to a mistake in the baton exchange and they were eliminated.

References

External links

1983 births
Living people
Nigerian male sprinters
Olympic athletes of Nigeria
Athletes (track and field) at the 2008 Summer Olympics
21st-century Nigerian people